Choisir (18 September 1999 – 7 December 2021) was an Australian-bred dual hemisphere-winning Thoroughbred racehorse. He became the first Australian-trained winner of the Group Two King's Stand Stakes. The same year, Choisir also won the Golden Jubilee Stakes and was second in the July Cup.

Breeding
He was sired by the Group one (G1) winner Danehill Dancer (sire of over 500 individual starters for nine G1 winners); his dam Great Selection was by Lunchtime (GB). Choisir was a full brother to Danny Dancer, who won five races in Australia, and a half-brother to Supermarket (by Zephyr Zip ((NZ)), won eight races in Australia and dam of three winners) and Great Chic (by Prince of Birds ((USA)), dam of three winners).

Racing career
Choisir was trained by Paul Perry who was based at Broadmeadow Racecourse.

At two years
At two Choisir won the Group 3 STC Skyline Stakes over 1,200 metres, the listed AJC Breeders' Plate over 1,000 m., Inglis 2 YO Classic (1,200 m.) and was second in the Group one (G1) AJC Sires Produce Stakes, G2 STC Pago Pago Stakes, 2 YO Conditions Handicap, along with third placings in the G1 STC Golden Slipper Stakes and AJC Champagne Stakes.

At three years
Choisir won the G1 VRC Lightning Stakes, Linlithgow Stakes, had third placings in the G1 MRC Oakleigh Plate, G1 2002 Caulfield Guineas,  G2 AJC Stan Fox Stakes, G3 VRC L'Oreal Paris Plate.

At four years
At four Choisir won the G1 Royal Ascot Golden Jubilee Stakes (6 f.) and the G2 King's Stand Stakes (5 f.) as well as placing second in the G1 Newmarket July Cup.

When Choisir's career was over, Perry hoped that Fastnet Rock would repeat Choisir's successful English campaign, however Fastnet Rock suffered from travel sickness and was unable to race in the United Kingdom.

Stud record
Coolmore Stud Australia purchased Choisir to begin a new career as a shuttle stallion just two days after Choisir had finished second in the July Cup.

Choisir is standing at a service fee of $29,700 at Coolmore Stud in 2019. He was pensioned from the breeding barn at the end of the 2020 breeding season. 

Choisir died at Coolmore Stud on 7 December 2021.

Notable stock

Choisir has sired 12 individual Group 1 winners

c = colt, f = filly, g = gelding

References

Racehorses bred in Australia
Racehorses trained in Australia
1999 racehorse births
2021 racehorse deaths
Thoroughbred family 8-f